Crawley railway station is a railway station serving the town of Crawley in West Sussex, England. It is operated by Southern. The station is the last stop on the Arun Valley Line before it joins the Brighton Main Line.

History

The single track branch line of the London Brighton and South Coast Railway between Three Bridges and Horsham was opened on 14 February 1848. Crawley and Faygate were intermediate stations, each with two platforms to enable trains to pass. The line was doubled throughout during 1862 to coincide with the extension of the railway from Horsham to the Arun Valley.

The first Crawley station was situated immediately adjacent to the main High Street, with station buildings on the north side of the railway line.

With the continued development of the New Town during the 1950s and 1960s it soon became clear that the station was too small, and a new station building was opened 28 July 1968 at the current site. The new station was funded by a six-storey commercial development above the new British Rail station. The original station buildings were demolished in August 1968, but the platforms still survive.

A planning application was approved on 16 August 2016 for the demolition and redevelopment of the station buildings to include residential apartments, retail space and multi-storey car parking.

In 2020, an accessible footbridge with lifts was installed. It was due to open by autumn 2020.

Facilities

Concourse
Ticket office (×2)
Quick Ticket
Vending machine
Pumpkin Cafe
Waiting room (×2)
Toilets
Car park
Bicycle storage
Ticket barriers

Services 
Services at Crawley are operated by Southern and Thameslink using  and  EMUs.

The typical off-peak service in trains per hour is:
 2 tph to  via 
 2 tph to  via Gatwick Airport,  and 

On Sundays, there is an hourly service between London Victoria, Bognor Regis and Portsmouth Harbour and an hourly service between Horsham and London Bridge only.

Signal box

The original signal box, dating from 1877, survives. It is a tall box with a timber superstructure on a brick base and was built by the firm of Saxby and Farmer. It was made redundant in 1978 when the railway level crossing gates were removed. It is a Grade II listed building and has recently been partially restored.

The former goods yard to the east of the old Crawley Station was closed in the 1960s and demolished to make way for the new station.

References

External links 

Railway station, Crawley
Transport in Crawley
Railway stations in West Sussex
DfT Category D stations
Former London, Brighton and South Coast Railway stations
Railway stations in Great Britain opened in 1848
Railway stations in Great Britain closed in 1968
Railway stations opened by British Rail
Railway stations in Great Britain opened in 1968
Railway stations served by Govia Thameslink Railway
1848 establishments in England